Lennart Mertens (born 14 August 1992) is a Belgian footballer who plays as a forward for Deinze in the Challenger Pro League.

Career
In July 2016, Mertens joined Belgian First Amateur Division club Deinze on a free transfer. He made his competitive debut for the club on 27 August 2016, coming on as a 70th-minute substitute for Gert van Walle in a 3-1 Cup defeat to Lommel. After scoring 28 goals in 24 games during the 2019-20 season, Mertens signed a new three year deal with the club.

Honors
Deinze
Belgian First Amateur Division Champion: 2019–20

References

External links

1992 births
Living people
Belgian footballers
Association football forwards
K.M.S.K. Deinze players
Club NXT players
Challenger Pro League players
Belgian Third Division players